Let's Not Forget the Story is the debut album of Colorado worship band, Foolish Things.

Track listing
"Who Can Compare" - 4:26 (Jorgensen)
"Spirit Come" - 3:29 (Jorgensen, Labriola)
"Be Still" - 3:10 (Labriola)
"Find Your Way Back" - 4:37 (Jorgensen)
"The First Lie" - 5:16 (Jorgensen)
"Hey You" - 3:02 (Labriola)
"Capitol P" - 3:09 (Labriola)
"This Love" - 3:53 (Jorgensen)
"Can't Believe" - 5:20 (Jorgensen)
"It's Not Home" - 4:46 (Jorgensen)
"Forgive Me" - 4:49 (Jorgensen)

Personnel
Mark Labriola II - vocals, background vocals, programming
Isaac Jorgensen - vocals, background vocals, programming, piano, acoustic guitar, electric guitar
Nate Phillips - bass guitar
James Rightmer - background vocals, programming, piano, keyboards, electric guitar
Shaul Hagen - drums

References 

2006 debut albums
Foolish Things albums
Inpop Records albums